HowStuffWorks is an American commercial infotainment website founded by professor and author Marshall Brain, to provide its target audience an insight into the way many things work. The site uses various media to explain complex concepts, terminology, and mechanisms—including photographs, diagrams, videos, animations, and articles.

The website was acquired by Discovery Communications in 2007 but was sold to Blucora in 2014. The site has since expanded out into podcasting, focusing on factual topics. In December 2016, HowStuffWorks, LLC became a subsidiary of OpenMail, LLC, later renamed System1. In 2018, the podcast division of the company, which had been spun-off by System1 under the name Stuff Media, was acquired by iHeartMedia for $55 million.

History 
In 1998, North Carolina State University instructor Marshall Brain started the site as a hobby. In 1999, Brain raised venture capital and formed HowStuffWorks, Inc. In March 2002, HowStuffWorks was sold to the Convex Group, an Atlanta-based investment and media company founded by Jeff Arnold, founder and former chief executive officer (CEO) of WebMD. The headquarters moved from Cary, North Carolina, to Atlanta. HowStuffWorks originally focused on science and machines, ranging from submarines to common household gadgets and appliances. After adding a staff of writers, artists, and editors, content expanded to a larger array of topics.

On October 20, 2004, Stuffo.com was created, and HowStuffWorks moved its entertainment section over to the new website. In 2005, the team disbanded Stuffo.

The domain HowStuffWorks.com attracted at least 58 million visitors annually by 2008, according to a Compete.com survey.

There have been four HowStuffWorks books—two illustrated hardcover coffee table books, HowStuffWorks and More HowStuffWorks, and two un-illustrated paperbacks, How Much Does the Earth Weigh? and What If?. HowStuffWorks previously put out an educational magazine, HowStuffWorks Express, for middle-school students. The company has also released a series of HowStuffWorks trivia "LidRock" discs—CD-ROMs sold on fountain drink lids at Regal Theaters.

In 2005, HowStuffWorks became the exclusive online publisher for Publications International, Ltd., Consumer Guide and Mobil Travel Guide.

Howstuffworks.com spun off its international division when it went public (Nasdaq:HSWI) via an acquisition of INTAC, a China-based company. In March 2007, HSW International launched its Portuguese website with headquarters in São Paulo, Brazil. The Portuguese name of the site is Como Tudo Funciona ("how everything works"). In June 2008, the Chinese site was launched with new headquarters in Beijing, China. The URL roughly translates to "Knowledge Information Web".

On October 15, 2007, Discovery Communications announced it had bought HowStuffWorks for $250 million. The company later chose to use the name HowStuffWorks as the title of a television series on its Discovery Channel. The series, which focuses on commodities, premiered in November 2008 and is similar in style and content to other "how it works" programs, like Modern Marvels.

On November 2, 2009, HSW International co-founded Sharecare, developing a social QA platform through which users ask health and wellness-related questions, receiving answers from industry experts. Other co-founders in Sharecare include Jeff Arnold, Dr. Mehmet Oz, Harpo Productions, Discovery Communications, and Sony Pictures Television.

On April 21, 2014, Discovery Communications announced that it had sold HowStuffWorks to Blucora for $45 million. In July 2016, Blucora announced the sale of its Infospace business, including HowStuffWorks, to OpenMail for $45 million. OpenMail was later renamed System1.

In 2014, HowStuffWorks moved its headquarters from Buckhead to Ponce City Market, a new mixed-use development in the Old Fourth Ward neighborhood of Atlanta. In June 2017, it announced the hiring of Cracked.com founder and former editor-in-chief Jack O'Brien for its new comedy podcasting division.

In 2017, System1 spun off the podcast department of HowStuffWorks as Stuff Media, retaining the HowStuffWorks website. In September 2018, Stuff Media announced its sale to radio broadcaster iHeartMedia for $55 million.

Podcasts 
HowStuffWorks maintained a large number of podcasts, hosted by its staff writers and editors, but now all former HSW podcasts are owned and operated by iHeartRadio. 

 The Daily Zeitgeist: a twice-daily podcast, humorously self-described as "second-rate," that discusses what is trending in daily. It is co-hosted by Jack O'Brien and Miles Gray, and features a rotating guest.
 Stuff You Should Know: an audio podcast and video series on various topics from all fields of interest, co-hosted by senior staff writers Josh Clark and Charles W. "Chuck" Bryant. In older episodes, editors Candace Keener and Chris Pollette co-hosted with Clark before Bryant became the permanent co-host. The podcast falls under the category of "Society and Culture". It was granted recognition as one of iTunes' Best of 2008 podcasts.
 Stuff You Missed in History Class, originally called Fact or Fiction? History Stuff for the History Buff: important historical events, originally hosted by Candace Keener and Josh Clark. He was replaced by Jane McGrath in November 2008, who in turn was replaced in June 2009 by Katie Lambert. In August 2009, Keener was replaced by Sarah Dowdey. In November 2010, Deblina Chakraborty replaced Lambert, Candace Keener guest co-hosting for three episodes between Lambert's departure and Chakraborty's arrival. In February 2013, Chakraborty left the podcast and was replaced by editor Holly Frey. In March 2013, Dowdey was replaced by Tracy Wilson.
 TechStuff: dedicated to demystifying technology and discussing its impact on society, originally hosted by technology editor Chris Pollette and senior staff writer Jonathan Strickland. In January 2013, Chris Pollette was replaced as co-host by Social Media Editor Lauren Vogelbaum. Vogelbaum left the program in 2015 and Strickland became a solo host. Topics range from the history of tech companies (i.e. the recent RIM Podcast) to the way a piece of technology works (I.e. a podcast on micropayments) to the way things work to fictional tech ("The Tech Of Doctor Who").
 BrainStuff: a podcast originally hosted by Marshall Brain. It was formerly hosted by a rotating cast of HSW editors, then Christian Sager and now Lauren Vogelbaum, and deals with natural sciences. Usually is a 5 to 10-minute podcast.
 Stuff Mom Never Told You: explores feminism and gender roles, and highlights notable pioneering women, hosted by Anney Reese and Samantha McVey. Former hosts include Caroline Ervin and Cristen Conger, the latter of whom co-creates the show with Molly Edmonds. Ervin replaced original host Edmonds in 2011. Conger and Ervin left the show in 2016; it relaunched in 2017 with new hosts Emilie Aries and Bridget Todd. Host Anney Reese replaced Aries in early 2018, and Todd left the show in late 2018 to be replaced by McVey. 
 Stuff of Genius: was a short video format podcast that focuses on an inventor or innovator (i.e., genius) for each episode. The video features humorous animation with a voice over originally provided by site founder Marshall Brain with later episodes narrated by Jonathan Strickland.
Stuff They Don't Want You To Know: a video and audio podcast that focuses on conspiracy theories and the evidence and arguments for or against them. Hosted by Ben Bowlin, Matt Frederick, and Noel Brown.
 Stuff To Blow Your Mind (formerly Stuff From the Science Lab): focuses on natural science. It is hosted by Robert Lamb, one of the site's senior writers, and Joe McCormick. They replaced Julie Douglas, a writer and editor, who launched the "Stuff of Life" podcast in 2015. Christian Sager left the show in December 2017.
Savor: a food podcast hosted by Lauren Vogelbaum and Anney Reese. Formerly FoodStuff.
 Part-Time Genius:: a general interest podcast hosted by Mental Floss founders Will Pearson and Mangesh Hattikudur.
 Atlanta Monster: in cooperation with Tenderfoot TV, a crime podcast about the Atlanta murders of 1979–81. Hosted by Payne Lindsey of podcast Up and Vanished.
 Movie Crush: is a movie discussion podcast hosted by senior staff writer Charles "Chuck" Bryant where he interviews celebrities about their favourite movie.
 Drawn: The Story of Animation: a co-production of HowStuffWorks and Cartoon Network, a weekly podcast hosted by Holly Frey discussing the history of animated cartoons.
 Couples Therapy: a podcast hosted by Naomi Ekperigin and Andy Beckerman which examines relationships.
 Behind the Bastards: is a weekly comedic history podcast hosted by Robert Evans exploring the lives of deplorable historical figures.
Ridiculous History: is a semiweekly comedy history podcast about the more unknown, ridiculous, and unbelievable parts of history. Hosted by Ben Bowlin and Noel Brown.
Food 360 with Marc Murphy: The Chopped judge and restaurateur examines food culture from every possible angle, shedding new light on familiar culinary topics.

Canceled 
 CarStuff (formerly High Speed Stuff): dealing with automotive topics and is hosted by editor Scott Benjamin and writer Ben Bowlin.
 HowStuffWorks NOW: an audio podcast that draws from the weekly NOW video series. It was hosted by Lauren Vogelbaum and featured rotating contributors.
The Stuff of Life: a podcast hosted by Julie Douglas that focuses on a different question each week. There was a regular guest roundtable segment as well as interviews with researchers and experts.
The Coolest Stuff on the Planet: was a video podcast that highlights a specific location and features geographic-specific facts and trivia.
Stuff To Make You Smarter: was a podcast focusing mainly on general topics and their impact on the human body. Hosted by writers Rob and Chris.
Stuff From the B-Side: was a podcast originally hosted by senior staff writer Charles "Chuck" Bryant and staff writer John Fuller and deals with music. Later episodes feature Mark Larson taking Charles Bryant's place as host. No new episodes have been released since December 2009.
PopStuff: was an opinion based podcast, featuring Pop culture related topics, including televisions shows and movies. Hosted by Holly and Tracy. The last episode aired on March 18, 2013, with reruns of certain episodes airing until June 3, 2013.
Stuff for a Stylish Home: was a podcast on home decor, DIY, and home style.
Fw: Thinking: a podcast that focuses on the future of science and technology. It was hosted by Jonathan Strickland, Lauren Vogelbaum, and Joe McCormick.

See also 
 eHow
 How It's Made
 The Way Things Work
 wikiHow

References

External links 

 
 
 How Stuff Works at Discovery Channel

2002 mergers and acquisitions
2007 mergers and acquisitions
2014 mergers and acquisitions
2016 mergers and acquisitions
2018 mergers and acquisitions
American educational websites
Education companies established in 1998
Internet properties established in 1998
Former Warner Bros. Discovery subsidiaries